Vladimir Smirnov (born 11 June 1947) is a Soviet ski jumper. He competed in the normal hill and large hill events at the 1968 Winter Olympics.

References

External links
 

1947 births
Living people
Soviet male ski jumpers
Olympic ski jumpers of the Soviet Union
Ski jumpers at the 1968 Winter Olympics
Skiers from Moscow